Mark Warren may refer to:

Mark Warren (footballer) (born 1974), English defender
Mark Warren (referee) (born 1960), British football (soccer) official
 Mark Warren, member of the British music group :zoviet*france:
Mark Warren (TV director) (1938–1999), American television and film director

See also
Marc Warren (disambiguation)